Roberto Tovar Faja  (born November 12, 1944) is a Costa Rican politician. He was the President of the Legislative Assembly of Costa Rica from 1992 to 1993.

References 

 Cédula de nombramiento como Ministro.(Spanish)
 Declaración ministerial conjunta (Biblioteca de ACNUR).(Spanish)
 Discurso como Ministro ante la Organización de Estados Americanos.(Spanish)
 Reunión de Cancilleres, preámbulo a la Cumbre Iberoamericana de Jefes de Estado y de Gobierno.(Spanish)

1944 births
Living people
Foreign ministers of Costa Rica
Presidents of the Legislative Assembly of Costa Rica